Zayas is a Castilian surname rooted in the toponym of the same name, which itself derives from the Basque word zai, meaning watchman or guard.

Places 
The following places in Spain are related to the surname Zayas:
Zayas de Báscones, Soria (es)
Zayas de la Torre, Soria (es)
Zayas de Torre, Soria (es)
Zayuelas, Soria (es)
Zay, Navarra
Zaya, Navarra
Zaitua, Vizcaya
Záitegui, Álava

People 
The following people have the surname Zayas or any of its variations:

Ada Zayas-Bazán, Cuban writer
Agustín de las Cuentas Zayas, Spanish Governor of Sonora (es)
Alberto Álvarez de Zayas, Cuban botanist
Alberto Zayas, Cuban rumba musician
Alexandra Zayas, American investigative reporter
Alfonso de Zayas de Bobadilla, Spanish aristocrat and Falange supporter (es)
Alfonso Zayas, Mexican actor (es)
Alfred-Maurice de Zayas, Cuban-American lawyer
Alfredo Zayas y Alfonso, President of Cuba between 1921 and 1925, brother of Juan Bruno Zayas
Anastacio Zayas Alvarado, Puerto Rican sugarcane worker
Ángel L. Malavé Zayas, Puerto Rican politician
Antonio de Zayas, Spanish diplomat and writer
Armando Zayas, Mexican orchestra director (es)
Bigram John Zayas, American DJ and producer
Billy Colón Zayas, Puerto Rican guitarist
Carlos Saladrigas Zayas, Cuban politician
Carlos Zayas, Spanish politician (es)
César Zayas, Paraguayan footballer
Cirilo R. Zayas, Paraguayan composer and writer
Cristóbal de Zayas, Spanish Governor of Yucatán (es)
Daniel de Zayas, Goya Award-winning sound engineer
David Zayas, Puerto Rican-American actor
Edwin Colón Zayas, Puerto Rican cuatro player
Eliseo Roberto Colón Zayas, Puerto Rican mass media researcher
Elizabeth Zayas Ortiz, Miss Puerto Rico 1976
Felipe Salido Zayas, Mexican politician (es)
Fernando de Zayas, Cuban entomologist
Francisco Zayas Seijo, Puerto Rican politician
Gabriel de Zayas, Spanish Secretary of State (es)
George de Zayas, Mexican caricature artist
Hector de Zayas, U.S. Marine Corps officer and Navy Cross recipient
Héctor Zayas Chardón, Puerto Rican cooperativist (es)
Ivania Zayas Ortiz, Puerto Rican singer
Jesús Carreras Zayas, Cuban commander (es)
Jesús Guerra Zayas, Cuban musician and songwriter  (es)
Joel Zayas, Paraguayan football goalkeeper
José Francisco Martí Zayas Bazán, Cuban politician and army general (es)
José Pascual de Zayas y Chacón, commander of the Spanish Army
Juan Alonso Zayas, Puerto Rican Second Lieutenant of the Spanish Army
Juan Antoine y Zayas, Spanish diplomat (es)
Juan Bruno Zayas, Cuban doctor and army general, brother of Alfredo Zayas (es)
Liza Colón-Zayas, American actress and playwright
Luis H. Zayas, American psychologist
Manuel Zayas, Cuban journalist and filmmaker (es)
María de Zayas, Spanish writer
Marius de Zayas, Mexican artist
Máximo Othón Zayas, Mexican politician
Miguel Aurelio Díaz Zayas, Cuban percussionist
Nicolás Osorio y Zayas, Spanish aristocrat (es)
Octavio Zaya, Spanish-American art critic
Orlando Zayas, Paraguayan beach soccer player
Pedro Pimentel Zayas, Spanish lieutenant general (es)
Pedro de Zayas, Spanish sculptor (es)
Rafael de Zayas Enríquez, Mexican historian
Ricky Zayas, Puerto Rican trumpeter and arranger
Roberto Muñoz-Zayas, President of the Puerto Rican Athletics Federation
Samuel Zayas, Dominican footballer
Sergio Mancilla Zayas, Mexican politician
Sergio Zayas, Argentine swimmer
Tomás Rafael Rodríguez Zayas, Cuban artist
Wampa Zayas, American heavy metal drummer
Yoan Limonta Zayas, Cuban baseball player
Yunior Díaz Zayas, Cuban track and field athlete

See also 
Zayas, the Castilian noble family with this surname

References 

Spanish-language surnames
Toponymic surnames